Semi-slugs, also spelled semislugs, are land gastropods whose shells are too small for them to retract into, but not quite vestigial. The shell of some semi-slugs may not be easily visible on casual inspection, because the shell may be covered over with the mantle.

This is a type of gastropod that is intermediate between a slug (without an external shell) and a land snail (with a large enough shell to retract completely into).

There exist a number of gastropod families that have semi-slugs species. There exist about 1,000 species of semi-slugs in comparison to about only 500 species of slugs.

Examples 
Semi-slugs have a worldwide distribution and have evolved in several families; genera include:
 Palearctic and Nearctic
 family Parmacellidae: Cryptella
 family Vitrinidae: Eucobresia, Semilimax, Vitrina, Vitrinobrachium
 Asia - Pacific
 family Ariophantidae: Parmarion, Ratnadvipia, Varadia
 family Helicarionidae: Attenborougharion, Helicarion, Howearion, Ibycus, Parmellops, Ubiquitarion
 Semi-slugs also exist but are exceptional in the Camaenidae.
 Neotropics
 family Amphibulimidae: Amphibulima, Gaeotis
 family Xanthonychidae: Cryptostrakon, Semiconchula, Xanthonyx
 family Pleurodontidae: Coloniconcha prima
 Tropical Africa
 family Urocyclidae: Gymnarion

See also
 "Leatherleaf slugs" - Veronicellidae

References 

Gastropod anatomy